The United States House of Representatives elections in California, 1879 were elections for California's delegation to the United States House of Representatives, which occurred on September 3, 1879. California's delegation remained unchanged, at three Republicans and one Democrat.

Results 
Final results from the Clerk of the House of Representatives:

District 1

District 2

District 3

District 4

See also 
46th United States Congress
Political party strength in California
Political party strength in U.S. states
United States House of Representatives elections, 1878

References 
California Elections Page
Office of the Clerk of the House of Representatives

External links 
California Legislative District Maps (1911-Present)
RAND California Election Returns: District Definitions

1879
United States House of Representatives
California